The Flandreau Santee Sioux Tribe are a federally recognized tribe of Santee Dakota people. Their reservation is the Flandreau Indian Reservation. The tribe are members of the Mdewakantonwan people, one of the sub-tribes of the Isanti (Santee) Dakota originally from central Minnesota.

In 1934, the Tribe was recognized under the Indian Reorganization Act of 1934. Notable tribal member Chief Little Crow participated in the Dakota War of 1862.

Tribal information
 Reservation: Flandreau Reservation; in Moody County, South Dakota
 Division: Santee
 Bands: Mdewakanton, Wahpekute
 Land Area: 5000 acres (without boundaries)
 Tribal Headquarters: Flandreau, South Dakota
 Time Zone: Central
 Traditional Language: Dakota
 Enrolled members living on reservation: 726
 Major Employers: Flandreau Indian School, Flandreau Santee Sioux Tribe, Royal River Casino

Tribal government
 Charter: Yes; Constitution and Bylaws: Yes - IRA
 Date Approved: April 24, 1936
 Name of Governing Body: Flandreau Santee Sioux Tribal Council
 Executive Committee: (4) President, Vice-President, Secretary, Treasurer and 4 additional Trustees who are elected by the tribal members. Tribal Treasurer is appointed.
 Dates of Constitutional amendments: October 16, 1967, November 14, 1984, May 23, 1990, May 13, 1997

Tribal elections
 Primary Election is at least forty-five days prior to the general election and General Election is held in conjunction with the August General Council meeting.
 Number of Election districts or communities: 1
 Executive Officers and Trustees serve four year terms. Trustee terms of office are staggered.

Tribal council meetings
 Quorum number: Executive Committee: 4 Executive members. 
 General Council meetings must have fifty percent of qualified voters. General Council meeting are the first Saturday of February, May, August, and November of each year. Executive Committee holds meetings at least once a month established by the President.

Education and media
 Newspaper: Moody County Enterprise, Flandreau, SD

Notable tribal members
 Chief Little Crow (1810-1863) spent much of his life in Minnesota, where he was the head of a Santee band. Little Crow, a bold and passionate orator, established himself as a spokesman for his people. After becoming chief around 1834, he sought justice for his people, but also tried to maintain relations with the whites. In 1862, he led the fight now known as the Minnesota Santee Conflict. In fact, this war was launched only in the face of starvation and only after the federal government didn't present land payments as promised. Little Crow was killed the following year. He is buried near Flandreau.

Legalization of cannabis
In mid-2015, the Tribe stated their intent to begin growing cannabis on one authorized site on their reservation, and commence selling the product on 1 January 2016, following a vote of tribal authorities which decided 5–1 to legalize cannabis.

References

Native American tribes in Minnesota
Native American tribes in South Dakota
Federally recognized tribes in the United States
 
1934 establishments in the United States